The 2010 FIBA Africa Under-18 Championship for Women was the 11th FIBA Africa Under-18 Championship for Women, played under the rules of FIBA, the world governing body for basketball, and the FIBA Africa thereof. The tournament was hosted by Egypt and ran from July 29 to August 6.

Egypt defeated Nigeria 63–62 in the final to win their first title, with both teams securing a spot at the 2011 FIBA U18 Women's World Cup.

Squads

Draw

Preliminary round 
Times given below are in UTC.

Group A

Group B

Knockout stage
Championship bracket

5-8th bracket

9th place match

Quarter-finals

5-8th classification

Semi-finals

7th place match

5th place match

Bronze medal match

Final

Final standings

Awards

All-Tournament Team

See also
 2011 FIBA Africa Championship for Women

External links
Official Website

References

2010 in African basketball
2010 in Egyptian sport
2010
International basketball competitions hosted by Egypt
2010 in youth sport
2010 in women's basketball